Jon Robert Dale Kennedy (born 20 September 1994) is an Australian professional baseball pitcher for the  of the Baseball Challenge League.

Career
Kennedy began his professional career with the Melbourne Aces of the Australian Baseball League and signed with the Atlanta Braves in 2015. He made his debut with Atlanta's organization in 2016 and split time between the Rome Braves, Danville Braves, and Carolina Mudcats where he posted a combined 2.92 ERA and 1.27 WHIP in 19 total relief appearances between the three teams. He spent 2017 with Rome where he was 5–2 with a 2.87 ERA in 39 games.

International career
He was selected for the Australian national baseball team at the 2017 World Baseball Classic and 2019 WBSC Premier12.

Personal life
Kennedy's uncle is Philip Dale.

References

External links

1995 births
Living people
Australian expatriate baseball players in Japan
Australian expatriate baseball players in the United States
Baseball pitchers
Carolina Mudcats players
Danville Braves players
Florida Fire Frogs players
Gwinnett Stripers players
Melbourne Aces players
Rome Braves players
Sportspeople from Melbourne
2017 World Baseball Classic players
2023 World Baseball Classic players